The 2016 African Men's Junior Handball Championship was the 21st edition of the tournament, organized by the African Handball Confederation, under the auspices of the International Handball Federation and held at the Palais des Sports de l'ACI 2000 in Bamako, Mali from September 11 to 18, 2016.

Tunisia was the champion and qualified, alongside the three remaining top teams. to the 2017 world championship.

Teams

Schedule & results

Times given below are in GMT UTC+0.

 Note:  Qualified to the 2017 World Championship

Final standings

Awards

See also
 2016 African Men's Handball Championship
 2016 African Men's Youth Handball Championship

References

External links

2016 in African handball
African Men's Junior Handball Championship
International handball competitions hosted by Kenya
Junior